Mount Pelion East is a mountain located in the Central Highlands region of Tasmania, Australia. The mountain is situated within the Cradle Mountain-Lake St Clair National Park.

Unlike Mount Pelion West, Pelion East is not a massive mountain, more pinnacle-like, the spire shape having been caused by harsh glacial erosion many thousands of years ago.

Location and access 
The mountain summit is at grid reference 225655 UTM Zone 55S and high resolution topographical information is available on Tasmap Cathedral 1:25000. To the west is Mount Pelion West, due north is Lake Ayr, due east is Curate Bluff in the Cathedral Mountain range, and due south is Mount Massif. The mountain is made up of dolerite and the lower slopes are covered in low scrub, including scoparia.  This mountain is approximately midway between Pelion Hut and Kia Ora Hut on the Overland Track which passes within  of the summit.

Mount Pelion East may be accessed via the Overland Track from Cradle Mountain during the main walking season from November to April when a booking and fee system applies. During this walking period the track is restricted to limited numbers and north-south traffic only is permitted. In the off-season, walking is also allowed from the south at Lake St Clair. Another access route is the combined Arm River and Innes Tracks which passes Lake Ayr and joins the Overland Track at Pelion Plains. A wider overview of the area and access points is available on the Tasmap Cradle Mountain-Lake St Clair map and notes publication.

See also

 List of highest mountains of Tasmania
 Mount Pelion West

References

External links
 

Pelion East
Pelion East
Pelion East